Greenamyer is a surname. Notable people with the surname include:

Darryl Greenamyer (1936–2018), American aviator
George Greenamyer (born 1939), American sculptor